Jayme Oliver Cramer (born January 20, 1983) is an American competition swimmer who specializes in backstroke and butterfly events.  He has represented the United States as a member of the national swim team in the FINA world championships and the Pan American Games.

Cramer won the bronze medal in the men's 100-meter backstroke at the 2003 Pan American Games in Santo Domingo, Dominican Republic.  Two years later, at the 2005 World Aquatics Championships (long-course) in Montreal, Quebec, he won gold medals in the 4×200-meter freestyle and 4×200-meter freestyle.  At the 2006 short-course world championships in Shanghai, China, he won a silver medal in the 4x100-meter medley relay, and bronze medals in the 4x200-meter freestyle relay and 100-meter butterfly.

He is a 2001 graduate of St. Xavier High School in Cincinnati, Ohio.

Cramer now resides in Louisiana with his family, where he is the CFO and Head Coach for Crawfish Aquatics.

References

External links
 

1983 births
Living people
American male backstroke swimmers
American male butterfly swimmers
American male freestyle swimmers
Medalists at the FINA World Swimming Championships (25 m)
People from Falls Church, Virginia
St. Xavier High School (Ohio) alumni
Swimmers at the 2003 Pan American Games
Pan American Games bronze medalists for the United States
Pan American Games medalists in swimming
Medalists at the 2003 Pan American Games
20th-century American people
21st-century American people